Patellidae is a taxonomic family of sea snails or true limpets, marine gastropod molluscs in the clade Patellogastropoda.

(The superfamily Patelloidea should not be confused with the similar-sounding genus of true limpets Patelloida which is in the family Lottiidae within the superfamily Lottioidea, also part of the Patellogastropoda.)

Taxonomy 
A cladogram showing phylogenic relations of Patellogastropoda based on molecular phylogeny research by Nakano & Ozawa (2007):

Genera 
Genera and species in the family Patellidae include:
 † Berlieria de Loriol, 1903 
 Cymbula H. & A. Adams, 1854
 Helcion Montfort, 1810
 Patella Linnaeus, 1758
 † Proscutum P. Fischer, 1885 
 Scutellastra H. Adams & A. Adams, 1854

Synonyms
 Ancistromesus Dall, 1871: synonym of Scutellastra H. Adams & A. Adams, 1854 
 Ansates G.B. Sowerby II [ex Klein], 1839 - synonym of Patella Linnaeus, 1758
 Costatopatella Pallary, 1912: synonym of Patella Linnaeus, 1758
 Helioniscus is a synonym of Cellana H. Adams, 1869 from family Nacellidae
 Laevipatella Pallary, 1920: synonym of Cymbula H. Adams & A. Adams, 1854
 Patellanax Iredale, 1924: synonym of Scutellastra H. Adams & A. Adams, 1854 (junior synonym)
 Patellastra Monterosato, 1884: synonym of Patella Linnaeus, 1758
 Patellidea Thiele, 1891: synonym of Scutellastra H. Adams & A. Adams, 1854 
 Patellona Thiele, 1891: synonym of Cymbula H. Adams & A. Adams, 1854
 Patellus Montfort, 1810: synonym of Patella Linnaeus, 1758 (Invalid: unjustified emendation of Patella)
 Patina Gray, 1847: synonym of Patella Linnaeus, 1758
 Penepatella Iredale, 1929: synonym of Scutellastra H. Adams & A. Adams, 1854 (junior synonym)

Human uses
Some limpet species in this family are used as a food source in various countries.

A study of Patella caerulea found that this limpet reduced the cover of algae and barnacles on steel panels suspended in sea water in a commercial port, suggesting that the limpet could be used to inhibit fouling of ship hulls.

See also 
 Limpet

References

 Nakano T. & Sasaki T. (2011) Recent advances in molecular phylogeny, systematics and evolution of patellogastropod limpets. Journal of Molluscan Studies 77: 203-217.

External links
 Rafinesque, C. S. (1815). Analyse de la nature ou Tableau de l'univers et des corps organisés. [Book. 1-224, (self-published) Palermo]
 Bouchet, P. & Rocroi, J.-P. (2005). Classification and nomenclator of gastropod families. Malacologia. 47 (1-2): 1-397
 Ridgeway, S.A., Reid, D.G., Taylor, J.D., Branch, G.M. & Hodgson, A.N., 1998. A cladistic phylogeny of the family Patellidae (Mollusca: Gastropoda). Philosophical transactions of the Royal Society of London, Series B, 353(1375), 1645-1671

 
Taxa named by Constantine Samuel Rafinesque